Swords was a constituency represented in the Irish House of Commons to 1801.

Members of Parliament
1585 Walter Fitzsimons and Thomas Taylor
1613–1615 William Blakeney and John Fitzsimons (died and replaced by Richard Carwell)
1634–1635 Richard Barnewell and Lucas Netterville (expelled 1634 and replaced by Sir William Anderson )
1639–1642 John Taylor and George Blakeney (both expelled 1642)
1642 Charles Forster and Christopher Huetson
1661–1666 John Povey and Sir William Tichborne

1689–1801

Notes

References

Constituencies of the Parliament of Ireland (pre-1801)
Historic constituencies in County Dublin
Swords, Dublin
1800 disestablishments in Ireland
Constituencies disestablished in 1800